Arthur Tuur Albert Ceuleers  (28 February 1916 in Antwerp, Belgium – 5 August 1998) was a Belgian footballer. A striker for Beerschot VAC, he was twice Champion of Belgium in 1938 and 1939.

He was also a Belgian international in 1937 and 1938, 4 times. He was recalled ten years later, in 1948 for a match against France, but did not play. He continued his career after the war until 1951, with Racing Club Bruxelles.

He is the  highest scorer in the history of the Belgian First Division, with 280 goals in 401 matches.

Honours 
 International in 1937 and 1938 (4 caps and 2 goals)
 First international : Belgium-France, 3-1 21 February 1937 (one goal)
 Picked for the 1938 World Cup (did not play)
 Belgian Champion in 1938 and 1939 with Beerschot VAC

References

External links
 

Belgium international footballers
K. Beerschot V.A.C. players
1916 births
Footballers from Antwerp
1998 deaths
Belgian footballers
1938 FIFA World Cup players
Belgian football managers
K. Beringen F.C. managers
Association football forwards